HNLMS Pelikaan (A804) is a logistic support vessel of the Royal Netherlands Navy. The ship was built and designed specially for the Caribbean Sea, and is permanently based at Curaçao. She entered service on 12 June 2006. The vessel has the Det Norske Veritas (DNV) Classification 1A1 E0 NAUT-OC ICS CRANE. Pelikaan provides search and rescue and disaster and humanitarian relief to Dutch operations in the Netherlands Antilles. The vessel can also be used for amphibious warfare.

Design and description 
Pelikaan is a logistic support vessel of the Royal Netherlands Navy designed for use in the Netherlands Antilles and the Caribbean Sea and to provide sealift for the Netherlands Marine Corps. Naval ships in the Caribbean perform a series of policing tasks involving drug smuggling and fisheries protection, along with providing search-and-rescue and disaster and humanitarian relief.

The ship is armed with two single-mounted  machine guns. Pelikaan has a large cargo area located on the main deck. The area, serviced by a large electro-hydraulic deck crane forward, can be used for amphibious operations, with space for six rigid inflatable boats, four trucks and support equipment. The ship can support up to 77 personnel, including 15 crew with space for 62 marines.

History
The Royal Netherlands Navy placed an order with Damen Shipbuilding for a replacement for the existing logistic support vessel operating in the Caribbean, on 10 January 2005. The vessel's hull was constructed at the Damen shipyard in Galați, Romania with the keel laid down on 25 August 2005 and launched on 7 February 2006. The hull was then taken to Gorinchem, Netherlands to be completed and Pelikaan was commissioned on 12 June 2006.

In January 2010, the ship arrived at Port-au-Prince with relief supplies for the victims of the 2010 Haiti earthquake. She was the first ship to use the Port international de Port-au-Prince after the quake. In March 2013, Pelikaan sailed to Saba to provide drinking water after the island suffered a serious drought.

In 2015, Pelikaan provided support to Dominica after the island nation was struck by a tropical storm. The vessel returned to Haiti in 2016 to provide aid following the arrival of Hurricane Matthew. In September 2017, the ship provided support to Sint Maarten after the island was struck by Hurricane Irma. 

In January 2018, the Royal Netherlands Navy contracted COTECMAR to carry out maintenance work for the ship at their yard in Cartagena, Colombia. Pelikaan underwent modernisation in 2020 in the Netherlands.

Notes

Citations

References

External links

Auxiliary ships of the Royal Netherlands Navy
2010 Haiti earthquake relief
2006 ships